Pamatan is the name of an undiscovered city on Lombok Island in Indonesia and the capital of the Lombok kingdom. The city was destroyed by the 1257 Samalas eruption and while the royal family and its king reportedly survived the city disappeared from history; if it were to be rediscovered it might become a "Pompeii of the East" and offer clues on how societies respond to volcanic catastrophes.

References

External links 

 

Lost ancient cities and towns
Former populated places in Indonesia
Historic sites in Indonesia